S. fallax may refer to:
 Sida fallax, the ʻilima in Hawaiian, a flowering plant species found in the Pacific Islands
 Sphagnum fallax, a moss species

See also